Fraxinus chinensis, the Chinese ash, is a species of flowering trees. Its leaves are used in traditional Chinese medicine for dysentery disorders.

Fraxinus chinensis is dioecious, with male and female flowers produced on separate individuals.

References 

 Bensky, D., Clavey, S., Stöger, E., Gamble, A., Bensky, L. L., & Martin-Kagartsang, J. (2016). Materia Medica (3rd ed.). Schiedlberg: BACOPA.
 Xhou-Zhong, Y., Flaws, B., & Shou-Zhong, Y. (1998). The divine farmer's Materia Medica: A translation of the "Shen Nong Ben Cao Jing." United States: Blue Poppy Press.

chinensis
Trees of Korea
Flora of China
Dioecious plants